Jimmy Ray Wilks (born March 12, 1958 in Los Angeles, California) is a former American football defensive end who played 13 seasons for the New Orleans Saints in the National Football League (NFL). He played college football at San Diego State. He is a member of Pasadena Sports Hall of Fame and New Orleans Saints Hall of Fame, and was also named to the Saints' 45th Anniversary Team.

References

External links
 

1958 births
Living people
American football defensive linemen
New Orleans Saints players
San Diego State Aztecs football players
Players of American football from Los Angeles
Pasadena High School (California) alumni
Players of American football from Pasadena, California